Mount Wright is a peak over 1,800 m in the north part of the Admiralty Mountains, Victoria Land, Antarctica. It rises between Shipley Glacier and Crume Glacier, 8 nautical miles (15 km) southwest of Birthday Point. The feature was named by the British Antarctic Expedition, 1910–13, after Charles S. Wright (1887–1975), physicist with the expedition.

Mountains of Victoria Land
Pennell Coast